This page provides the summaries of the CONCACAF Fourth Round, often referred to as "The Hexagonal" or "The Hex", matches for the 2010 FIFA World Cup qualification. The three group winners and three runners-up from the Third Round contest this round.

Format 
In this round, the group winners and runners-up from the Third Round formed a single double-round-robin, home-and-away group. The top three teams qualified for the 2010 FIFA World Cup. The fourth place team competed in a home-and-away play-off against the fifth-place team from CONMEBOL.

Standings

Results 
The allocation of teams in the draw took place in Johannesburg, South Africa on 22 November 2008.

Goalscorers 
88 goals were scored in 30 games, for an average of  goals per game.

7 goals

 Carlos Pavón

5 goals

 Carlo Costly
 Jozy Altidore

4 goals

 Álvaro Saborío

3 goals

 Celso Borges
 Cuauhtémoc Blanco
 Kerry Baptiste
 Michael Bradley
 Landon Donovan

2 goals

 Walter Centeno
 Andy Furtado
 Bryan Ruiz
 Cristian Castillo
 Julio Martínez
 Osael Romero
 Eliseo Quintanilla
 Julio César de León
 Guillermo Franco
 Carlos Edwards
 Conor Casey

1 goal

 Pablo Herrera
 Rudis Corrales
 Amado Guevara
 David Suazo
 Melvin Valladares
 Omar Bravo
 Nery Castillo
 Israel Castro
 Giovani dos Santos
 Enrique Esqueda
 Andrés Guardado
 Francisco Palencia
 Pável Pardo
 Óscar Rojas
 Miguel Sabah
 Carlos Salcido
 Carlos Vela
 Cornell Glen
 Khaleem Hyland
 Collin Samuel
 Hayden Tinto
 Dwight Yorke
 Carlos Bocanegra
 Jonathan Bornstein
 Ricardo Clark
 Charlie Davies
 Clint Dempsey
 Frankie Hejduk

1 own goal

 Marvin González (against Mexico)
 Julius James (against Costa Rica)

Attendances

Notes

References

External links 
FIFA.com

4
2008–09 in Mexican football
qualification 3
2008–09 in Honduran football
qualification 3
2008–09 in Salvadoran football
2009–10 in Salvadoran football
2009 in Trinidad and Tobago football
2009 in American soccer
qualification 3
2008–09 in Costa Rican football
Qual